Turtle in Paradise is a 2010 children's novel written by Jennifer L. Holm. The book is a 2011 Newbery Honor Book and also won the Golden Kite Award. The main character, Turtle, is eleven years old and lives in Key West, Florida during the Great Depression. The Labor Day Hurricane of 1935 is also mentioned in this book.

Plot 
Turtle Curry is an eleven-year-old girl living with her mother Sadiebelle and cat named Smokey in New Jersey, who is upset that her mother's new employer refuses to let Turtle and her cat stay in her house. Turtle says goodbye and enters the front seat of Mr. Lyle Edgit, a family friend and a merchant. When Turtle arrives in Key West, her Aunt Minerva "Minnie" is confused because she didn't receive a letter about Turtle coming to live with her. Aunt Minnie introduces her to their three cousins: Beans (the oldest cousin who is distant), Kermit (who has rheumatic fever and must nap in order to live), and Buddy (who is quick to pee in his pants). Just as Beans discover that Turtle is sharing rooms with him, Aunt Minnie chases Buddy around for his pants, while Kermit goes to ask Buddy if he stole his marbles.

Pressured by the conflict, Aunt Minnie forces them outside and continues housework. Then, a friend nicknamed Pork Chop greets them, followed by a cousin named Jelly greeting the boys before handing an envelope to Turtle, claiming that it was given to him by mistake. At a later time, the boys, who are affiliated with the "Diaper Gang," come to collect the crying babies to cure them. The next day, Pork Chop and Turtle visit the waterfront where they befriend a man named Slow Poke, who watches the swimming turtles. Subsequently, when an ice cream man named Jimmy yells (come get your ice cream) . Beans attempts to not pay for the ice cream, which goes wrong. Turtle then attempts and is successful. 

Following, Turtle is sitting on Aunt Minnie's porch while she plays with dolls, Buddy playing with marbles. Aunt Minnie takes the dolls, realizing that it was hers, and continues inside. At night, Turtle finally calls her mother, but is saddened that Mrs. Budnick, Sadie Belle's employer, prohibits her from using her telephone.

The next day, Kermit and Turtle take a walk on Duval Street, in which Turtle describes, "Duval Street's like a different Key West. It's nicer." At a coffeehouse, Turtle befriends a man named Johnny Cakes, who is a businessman. Suddenly, Slow Poke appears and hands an envelope to Johnny Cakes. He and Turtle agree to visit his boat, which is called "The Lost Love."

At the agreed time, the next day, Turtle accompanies Slow Poke and befriends Ollie, one of Slow Poke's assistants. In an attempt to earn their impression, Turtle lies about swimming professionally, but it backfires as she almost drowns. She is saved by Slow Poke, who subsequently chides her.

The next day, the gang visits Mrs. Soldano, a chef who makes bollos. She then talks about accomplishing her dreams of winning the bolita, Cuban lottery. Then, Mrs. Soldano requests for the gang to give a pack of bollos to an elderly lady named Miss Philomena, or "Nana Philly."

Back Cover Summary 
Life's nothing like the movies, and Turtle knows enough not to expect a Hollywood ending. After all, it's 1935, the Depression. Jobs, money, and sometimes even dreams are scarce. So when Turtle is sent off to Key West, Florida, to live with relatives she's never met, she doesn't even shed a tear. Florida's hot and strange, full of ragtag boy cousins, family secrets, and even buried treasure! Before she knows what's happened, Turtle comes out of the shell she's spent her life building, and discovers a world that's more exciting than any Hollywood blockbuster.

Description
Turtle in Paradise is a small format book measuring 5.2 x 0.5 x 7.6 inches. This small book is for children ages 9 to 12 years. The grade level for this book is 3 to 7. The Lexile for this book is 610L. The sales rank 96,734 in 6 months

Reception
Reed Elsevier in Publishers Weekly in 2010 states "Turtle, the witty 11-year-old narrator of this standout historical novel, is a straight shooter. 'Everyone thinks children are sweet as Necco Wafers, but I've lived long enough to know the truth: kids are rotten.' When her romantic and unrealistic mother, who's always falling in and out of love, gets a housekeeping job that won't allow children, she sends Turtle to her estranged family in Depression-era Key West" According to Horn Book Magazine, "It's 1935, and narrator Turtle is sent to live in Key West. With her stoic nature and quick wits, she's able to fit in with her boy cousins. Turtle's voice is tart and world-weary. Though her narrative is peppered with references from the time, modern-day readers will have no trouble relating, and the fast-moving plot will keep them interested to the end."

External links

Great Depression novels
2010 American novels
2010 children's books
 Children's historical novels
 American children's novels
 Newbery Honor-winning works
 Golden Kite Award-winning works
 Novels set in Florida
Random House books